The Albania national handball team is the national handball team of Albania, representing the country in international matches. It is controlled by the Fédération Albanaise de Handball.

IHF Emerging Nations Championship record
2015 – 14th place
2017 – 15th place

External links
IHF profile

Handball in Albania
Men's national handball teams
National sports teams of Albania